Salvia macrosiphon is a species of flowering plant in the family Lamiaceae. It is native to Iraq, Iran, Pakistan, Afghanistan, Transcaucasia, and Turkey, where it grows at the edges of fields. It is a perennial herb with a white corolla and ovate nutlets. It flowers in May and fruits from June onwards. Although the plant is similar to S. spinosa, it differs in that it has narrower leaves and calyces, is less indurate and has less spiny fruiting calyces, and possesses a longer corolla tube.

References

macrosiphon
Flora of Armenia
Flora of Azerbaijan
Flora of Georgia (country)
Flora of Iraq
Flora of Turkey
Taxa named by Pierre Edmond Boissier